The 2003 Nigerian Senate election in Oyo State was held on April 12, 2003, to elect members of the Nigerian Senate to represent Oyo State. Teslim Folarin representing Oyo Central and Robert Koleoso representing Oyo North won on the platform of Peoples Democratic Party, while Abiola Ajimobi representing Oyo South won on the platform of the Alliance for Democracy.

Overview

Summary

Results

Oyo Central 
The election was won by Teslim Folarin of the Peoples Democratic Party.

Oyo North 
The election was won by Robert Koleoso of the Peoples Democratic Party.

Oyo South 
The election was won by Abiola Ajimobi of the Alliance for Democracy.

References 

April 2003 events in Nigeria
Oyo State Senate elections
Oyo